In sports broadcasting, a sports commentator (also known as sports announcer or sportscaster) provides a real-time commentary of a game or event, usually during a live broadcast, traditionally delivered in the historical present tense. Radio was the first medium for sports broadcasts, and radio commentators must describe all aspects of the action to listeners who cannot see it for themselves. In the case of televised sports coverage, commentators are usually presented as a voiceover, with images of the contest shown on viewers' screens and sounds of the action and spectators heard in the background. Television commentators are rarely shown on screen during an event, though some networks choose to feature their announcers on camera either before or after the contest or briefly during breaks in the action.

Types of commentators

Main/play-by-play commentator

The main commentator, also called the play-by-play commentator or announcer in North America, blow-by-blow in combat sports coverage, lap-by-lap for motorsports coverage, or ball-by-ball for cricket coverage, is the primary speaker on the broadcast. Broadcasters in this role are adept at being articulate and carry an ability to describe each play or event of an often fast-moving sporting event. The play-by-play announcer is meant to convey the event as it is carried out. Because of their skill level, commentators like Al Michaels in the U.S., David Coleman in the UK and Bruce McAvaney in Australia may have careers in which they call several different sports at one time or another. Other main commentators may, however, only call one sport (Mike Emrick, for example, is known almost exclusively as an ice hockey broadcaster). The vast majority of play-by-play announcers are male; female play-by-play announcers had not seen sustained employment until the 21st century.

Radio and television play-by-play techniques involve slightly different approaches; radio broadcasts typically require the play-by-play host to say more to verbally convey the on-field activity that cannot be seen by the radio audience. It is unusual to have radio and television broadcasts share the same play-by-play commentator for the same event, except in cases of low production budgets or when a broadcaster is particularly renowned (Rick Jeanneret's hockey telecasts, for example, have been simulcast on radio and television since the late 1990s).

Analyst/color commentator

The analyst or color commentator provides expert analysis and background information, such as statistics, strategy on the teams and athletes, and occasionally anecdotes or light humor. They are usually former athletes or coaches in their respective sports, although there are some exceptions.

The term "color" refers to levity and insight provided by analyst. The most common format for a sports broadcast is to have an analyst/color commentator work alongside the main/play-by-play announcer. An example is NBC Sunday Night Football in the United States, which is called by color commentator Cris Collinsworth, a former NFL receiver, and play-by-play commentator Mike Tirico, a professional announcer. In the United Kingdom, however, there is a much less distinct division between play-by-play and color commentary, although two-man commentary teams usually feature an enthusiast with formal journalistic training but little or no competitive experience leading the commentary, and an expert former (or current) competitor following up with analysis or summary. There are however exceptions to this — most of the United Kingdom's leading cricket and snooker commentators are former professionals in their sports, while the former Formula One racing commentator Murray Walker had no formal journalistic training and only limited racing experience of his own (he had come from an advertising background and his initial hiring was more of a comic double act than a traditional sports commentary pairing). In the United States, Pat Summerall, a former professional kicker, spent most of his broadcasting career as a play-by-play announcer. Comedian Dennis Miller's short-lived run as part of the Monday Night Football booth in 2001 caused what Miller himself described as a "maelstrom" of perplexed reviews.

Although the combination of a play-by-play announcer and color commentator is now considered the standard, it was much more common for a broadcast to have only one play-by-play announcer working alone. Vin Scully, longtime announcer for the Los Angeles Dodgers, was one of the few examples of this practice lasting into the 21st century until he retired in 2016. The three-person booth is a format used on Monday Night Football, in which there are two color commentators, usually one being a former player or coach and the other being an outsider, such as a journalist (Howard Cosell was one long-running example) or a comedian (such as the aforementioned Dennis Miller).

Sideline reporter
A sideline reporter assists a sports broadcasting crew with sideline coverage of the playing field or court. The sideline reporter typically makes live updates on injuries and breaking news or conducts player interviews while players are on the field or court because the play-by-play broadcaster and color commentator must remain in their broadcast booth. Sideline reporters are often granted inside information about an important update, such as injury, because they have the credentials necessary to do so. In cases of big events, teams consisting of many sideline reporters are placed strategically so that the main commentator has many sources to turn to (for example some sideline reporters could be stationed in the dressing room area while others could be between the respective team benches). In the United States, sideline reporters are heavily restricted by NFL rules; in contrast, both the 2001 and 2020 incarnations of the XFL featured sideline reporters in a much more prominent role.

In motorsports, it is typical for there to be multiple pit reporters, covering the event from along pit road. Their responsibilities include covering breaking news trackside, probing crew chiefs and other team leaders about strategy, and commentating on pit stops from along the pit wall. On occasion in motorsport, the reporter on the sideline is an understudy to the lead commentator, as Fox NASCAR has used this tactic numerous times based on the career of Cup lead Mike Joy, a former pit reporter. Those who made the switch included Steve Byrnes (Truck Series, 2014), Vince Welch (Truck Series since late 2015), and Adam Alexander (did Cup for Fox-produced TNT broadcasts from 2010–14, Xfinity on Fox since 2015) did the same too.

Sports presenter/studio host
In British sports broadcasting, the presenter of a sports broadcast is usually distinct from the commentator, and often based in a remote broadcast television studio away from the sports venue. In North America, the on-air personality based in the studio is called the studio host. During their shows, the presenter/studio host may be joined by additional analysts or pundits, especially when showing highlights of various other matches (e.g. in 1985, Jim Nantz was the studio host for The Prudential College Football Report in Studio 43 in New York for CBS Sports, and during his four-year tenure there [the 1985 through 1988 college football seasons], he had Pat Haden [in 1985] and Ara Parseghian [in 1987 and 1988] as his co-hosts/pundits).

Other roles
Various sports may have different commentator roles to cover situations unique to that sport. In the 2010s, as popularized by Fox, American football broadcasts began to increasingly employ rules analysts to explain penalties and controversial calls, and analyze instant replay reviews to predict whether a call will or will not be overturned. These analysts are typically former referees.

Sportscaster
In North American English, sportscaster is a general term for any type of commentator in a sports broadcast. It may also refer to a sports talk show host or a newscaster covering sports news.

Esports
In video games, and particularly esports, commentators are often called shoutcasters; this term is derived from Shoutcast, an internet audio streaming plugin and protocol associated with the Winamp media player. They are also sometimes referred to as simply casters.

United States

While sports broadcasts took place from 1912, Florent Gibson of the Pittsburgh Post newspaper broadcast the first sports commentary in April 1921, covering the fight between Johnny Ray and Johnny "Hutch" Dundee at the Motor Square Garden, Pittsburgh.

The highest-paid sportscaster in the United States is Tony Romo, a former NFL quarterback and professional golfer who serves as lead color analyst for the NFL on CBS; Romo earns $17,000,000 per year for his contributions to the network.

Women
In 1975, the National Hockey League (NHL) made headlines when two coaches of the NHL All-Star Game in Montreal allowed Robin Herman (The New York Times) and Marcelle St. Cyr (CKLM radio in Montreal) access into the men's locker room. Both were believed to have been the first women ever allowed to enter a professional men's locker room to conduct a post-game interview. Sport organizations began to follow in the NHL's footsteps and allowed for other female sportswriters to be given the same access as men sportswriters.

It was not until the year 1977 when Melissa Ludtke, a sportswriter from Sports Illustrated, was given the assignment to cover the New York Yankees playoff series but was denied entry into the men's locker room. Baseball commissioner Bowie Kuhn and other officials chose to discriminate against her based on her sex. Knowing that this would put Sports Illustrated in a disadvantage from other publishers, Time Inc. and Ludtke filed a lawsuit against Kuhn.

The lawsuit was taken to the United States District Court in 1978 where Judge Constance Baker Motley ruled the act as violating the 14th Amendment of the United States Constitution. The court ruled that the Yankees organization devise a plan to protect the players of their privacy while female sportswriters conducted interviews, suggesting the use of towels.

After the access of allowing women in was put into effect, the Yankees organization allowed reporters to spend ten minutes interviewing players and was then asked to leave and wait. Male reporters were unhappy with this and blamed the women from keeping them out and not being able to do their job.

In 1990, the issue made its way back into the headlines when Lisa Olson made a public statement revealing that players from the New England Patriots had exposed themselves while interviews were being conducted. This prompted other female reporters who had been harassed to come forward. Their credibility was undermined by accusations that female interviewers appeared as being "too friendly" or conversing too long with players as though they were flirting. Thus, the issue of sexism was still present, despite the equal access to men's locker rooms.

In professional wrestling

Though not always the case, in professional wrestling, the color commentator is usually a "heel sympathizer" (or a supporter of the "bad guys") as opposed to the play-by-play announcer, who is more or less the "voice of the fans" as well as "babyface sympathizers" (or supporters of the "good guys"). Though both are supposed to show neutral stance while announcing, the color commentators (especially when they support heels) are usually more blatant about their stance than the play-by-play announcers. Jesse "The Body" Ventura and Bobby "The Brain" Heenan pioneered the "heel sympathizer" for color commentary in wrestling. Jerry "The King" Lawler later made a successful transition into the role, though Lawler has since shown more sympathy for faces (partially due to being over with fans after nearly forty years in wrestling).

"Rowdy" Roddy Piper and "Macho Man" Randy Savage pioneered the "babyface sympathizer" for color commentary in wrestling. Michael Cole has served as a babyface sympathizer for most of his announcing career. From 2010-2012, Cole showed arrogance and contempt for faces and more sympathy for the heels (partially due to being bullied by other face wrestlers like Stone Cold Steve Austin, The Rock, and John Cena, and the jealousy of Smackdown! General Manager Teddy Long, and other WWE Hall of Famers like Jerry "The King" Lawler and "Good Old J.R." Jim Ross (due to the liking favorite for reading emails from the Anonymous Raw General Manager, and for cheering for The Miz, all during this same time period)). However, Cole successfully transitioned back into being a face commentator in September 2012, and has stayed a face ever since. In some cases, commentators are also active managers for wrestlers, usually following continuity as heels. Former Extreme Championship Wrestling color commentator Cyrus was known for having dual roles as a heel manager and a somewhat neutral commentator. Acting as a commentator has also been used to keep injured wrestlers in the public eye while recuperating. Special guest color commentators serve a two purposes: the primary is usually to place them in position to interfere with the match they are calling, the second is to provide promoters with the opportunity to determine if this performer can speak well extemporaneously.

See also 
 Announcerless game, December 1980, experimental broadcast of an NFL game without TV commentators
 List of sports announcers
 List of Major League Baseball retired numbers#Broadcasters

References

External links 

 Sportcaster Chronicles – Internet radio show in which John Lewis interviews leading American sports announcers

Broadcasting occupations
 
Sports terminology
Television terminology
Sports mass media people